Rose Gertrude Namajunas (born June 29, 1992) is an American mixed martial artist. She is signed to the Ultimate Fighting Championship (UFC), where she competes in the women's strawweight division and is the former two-time UFC Women's Strawweight Champion. As of November 14, 2022, she is #2 in the UFC women's strawweight rankings, and as of March 7, 2023, she is #5 in the UFC women's pound-for-pound rankings.

Early life and education
She was named Rose in honor of her great-grandmother Rožė Gotšalkaitė Namajūnienė, whose husband Juozas was an Independent Lithuania military officer. He enlisted in the Lithuanian military in 1933, and was promoted to lieutenant in 1936. During the Soviet invasion of Lithuania in 1939, he fought in the resistance. After the Soviets occupied the country, Juozas was forced to enlist in the Red Army. Following the German declaration of war on the Soviet Union and the subsequent Soviet retreat from the Baltic states, Juozas left the Red Army and retired to civilian life. When the Soviets re-occupied Lithuania, Juozas was arrested by the NKVD and sent to a prison camp. He was killed by Soviet KGB agents near his home in 1968. Namajunas's grandfather Algimantas Andriukonis was a successful wrestler, and won national championships in Lithuania and competitions in the USSR. Namajunas regularly visits Lithuania and communicates in the Lithuanian language with her grandparents.

Namajunas's father Arturas, who suffered from schizophrenia, left the family when Rose was still young and died of pneumonia in Germany in 2008, when Rose was 16. Her mother was a pianist, trained at the Lithuanian Academy of Music and Theatre. Namajunas grew up in Milwaukee in a tough neighborhood, where she was a witness to violence from a young age. Her mother worked a lot and her brother was only rarely home. Her neighborhood friends nicknamed her "Thug Rose", due to the fact that she was the only white girl among them and was the smallest, yet acted tougher than any of them. Namajunas has mentioned being a victim of child sexual abuse, while emphasizing that she does not want to speak about specific details. She graduated from Milwaukee High School of the Arts, where she was an accomplished cross-country runner.

Martial arts training 
Rose started practicing taekwondo at the age of 5. She earned her poom belt (junior black belt) at age 9. After that, she went on to practice both karate and BJJ. While in high school, she started training in kickboxing and mixed martial arts with Duke Roufus at Roufusport, and she was also a senior-year wrestler at Milwaukee High School of the Arts.

Namajunas was scheduled to compete in a grappling match against Danielle Kelly on December 30, 2021, at Fury Pro Grappling 3 but was forced to withdraw from the event at the last minute due to a positive Covid-19 test and was replaced by Carla Esparza. Namajunas returned to the promotion for the main event of Fury Pro Grappling 6 on 30th December, 2022, where she faced fellow UFC veteran Gillian Robertson. Namajunas lost by the bout by rear-naked choke in 65 seconds.

Mixed martial arts career

Early career
Namajunas began competing in MMA as an amateur in 2010. She trained under Greg Nelson at Minnesota Martial Arts Academy. She racked up a perfect amateur record of 4–0 with 2 wins by TKO and 2 by decision. Both of the finishes came in the first round.

Invicta Fighting Championship
She made her professional debut against Emily Kagan at Invicta FC 4: Esparza vs. Hyatt on January 5, 2013. After two back-and-forth rounds, Namajunas was able to secure the victory via submission due to a rear-naked choke in round three. The victory in her pro debut also earned her the Submission of the Night bonus.

In her second professional appearance, Namajunas faced Kathina Catron at Invicta FC 5: Penne vs. Waterson on April 5, 2013. She won the fight by submission due to a flying armbar just 12 seconds into the first round. This performance garnered Namajunas her second Invicta Submission of the Night award.

Namajunas fought fellow undefeated prospect Tecia Torres at Invicta FC 6: Coenen vs. Cyborg on July 13, 2013. Namajunas lost the fight by unanimous decision.

The Ultimate Fighter
On December 11, 2013, it was announced that Namajunas was signed by the Ultimate Fighting Championship (UFC) along with 10 other strawweight fighters to compete on season 20 of The Ultimate Fighter, which would crown the first-ever UFC strawweight champion.

Namajunas was the fourth pick by coach Gilbert Melendez. She defeated Alex Chambers by submission due to a rear-naked choke in the preliminary round of the tournament.

In the quarter-finals, Namajunas faced Joanne Calderwood. She won the fight via kimura in the second round.

In the semi-finals, Namajunas faced Randa Markos. She again won the fight via kimura in the first round.

In the final of the tournament, she fought Carla Esparza on December 12, 2014 at The Ultimate Fighter: A Champion Will Be Crowned Finale for the inaugural UFC Women's Strawweight Championship. She lost the bout via rear-naked choke in the third round.

Ultimate Fighting Championship

Despite losing in The Ultimate Fighter finale, Namajunas was awarded two season $25,000 bonus awards for Performance of the Season and Fight of the Season for her bout with Joanne Calderwood.

Namajunas was expected to face Nina Ansaroff on May 23, 2015, in a preliminary bout at UFC 187. Prior to the fight, Ansaroff missed weight by 4 pounds and was fined 20 percent of her fight purse. The bout was scrapped entirely a couple of hours before the event, as Ansaroff was declared medically unfit to compete due to illness. According to Ansaroff's camp, she contracted the flu the week before, and the weight cut exacerbated the illness, forcing Ansaroff to abandon her weight cut early, and ultimately withdraw from the fight. Though the fight could not take place, Namajunas was paid her full fight purse (show- and win money).

Namajunas fought Angela Hill on October 3, 2015, at UFC 192. After some back-and-forth striking exchanges on the feet, Namajunas took Hill down with a trip off a punch. As Hill stood up, Namajunas quickly secured a rear-naked choke, submitting Hill in the first round.

In a quick turnaround, Namajunas faced streaking prospect Paige VanZant in the main event of UFC Fight Night 80 on December 10, 2015, replacing an injured Joanne Calderwood. Namajunas won the fight midway through the fifth round via submission due to a rear naked choke. The win also earned Namajunas her first Performance of the Night bonus award.

On April 16, 2016, Namajunas faced the undefeated Tecia Torres at UFC on Fox 19 in a rematch of their 2013 fight at Invicta FC 6. Namajunas won the fight via unanimous decision.

On July 30, 2016, Namajunas fought Karolina Kowalkiewicz at UFC 201 in a match regarded as a title eliminator. Kowalkiewicz defeated Namajunas via split decision. Both participants were awarded Fight of the Night for their performance.

Namajunas faced Michelle Waterson on April 15, 2017, at UFC on Fox 24. Namajunas won by submission due to a rear-naked choke in round 2, marking the 5th submission finish in her career.

Strawweight champion
Namajunas faced Strawweight champion Joanna Jędrzejczyk at UFC 217 at Madison Square Garden in New York on November 4, 2017. She came in as a big underdog against the undefeated champion. Namajunas, in what was regarded as a huge upset, won by KO in first round to be crowned the new UFC Women's Strawweight Champion. The win also earned Namajunas her second Performance of the Night bonus award. This was Namajunas's first knockout victory in her professional career (2 TKO-wins as an amateur). At the UFC 217 post-fight press conference, Namajunas stated that she intended to use her champion status as a platform to spread awareness of mental illness.

In the first defense of her title, Namajunas faced Jędrzejczyk in a rematch that took place on April 7, 2018, at UFC 223. She won the fight by unanimous decision. Namajunas spent the remainder of the year recovering from a lingering case of spinal stenosis from a C6 vertebral compression fracture, symptoms of which manifested while training with Valentina and Antonina Shevchenko in 2017, and had intensified during training camp for UFC 223.

In her second title defense, Namajunas faced Jéssica Andrade in the main event at UFC 237 on May 11, 2019, in Andrade's home country of Brazil, in what would be Namajunas's first MMA fight outside the United States. Namajunas lost the fight by knockout via a slam in the second round. The fight earned her the Fight of the Night award.

Post-reign
Namajunas was scheduled to face Jéssica Andrade for a rematch on April 18, 2020 at UFC 249. On April 8, 2020, Namajunas withdrew from the event, with her manager citing a pair of deaths in the family related to the COVID-19 pandemic as the reason.  Instead the bout was rescheduled and eventually took place on July 12, 2020 at UFC 251. Namajunas won the fight via split decision. This fight earned her the Fight of the Night award.

Second reign as strawweight champion
Namajunas faced Zhang Weili for the UFC Women's Strawweight Championship on April 24, 2021 at UFC 261. She won the fight by knockout early in the first round after landing a head kick, claiming the UFC Women's Strawweight World Champion for the second time. Namajunas became the first female fighter to regain a UFC Championship belt. The win earned Namajunas a Performance of the Night bonus award.

The rematch between Namajunas and Zhang for the UFC Women's Strawweight Championship took place on November 6, 2021 at UFC 268. After a back and forth bout, Namajunas defended her title, winning the bout via split decision. 14 out of 22 media scores gave it to Namajunas.

Namajunas faced Carla Esparza in a rematch for the UFC Women's Strawweight Championship on May 7, 2022 at UFC 274. Namajunas lost the fight and title via split decision in a bout that was heavily criticized for both fighter's low output. Despite the uneventful nature of the fight, Namajunas was given the first place Crypto.com "Fan Bonus of the Night" award.

Fighting style
Namajunas utilizes forward movement while pressuring opponents with jabs and high kicks. She is known for her advanced technical striking and footwork, using a variety of angles and several creative adjustments. During her fight at Invicta FC 6, she directed a series of axe kicks, front kicks, and forward roundhouse kicks to her opponent's head. After closing the distance, she will sometimes attempt to grapple and execute a submission.

Personal life
Namajunas is a Christian, and is an anti-communist. Prior to her first bout against Chinese fighter Zhang Weili, Namajunas spoke of the history of communist oppression in her ancestral homeland Lithuania and mentioned the documentary The Other Dream Team as an inspiration. She said the documentary gives a "good idea as to what my family had to go through, the reason I'm in the United States today, the reason that I do mixed martial arts, all of that stuff". She said that she viewed her fight with Zhang as symbolizing a fight between communism and freedom, saying that "Weili is red" and  "represents [communism]", relating it to her family's history under the former USSR regime in Lithuania, and stating that it is "better dead than red". In a further interview, Namajunas stated that her comments were not directed personally at Zhang, and said it was more about her own "internal battles" as well as some "generational PTSD". Zhang later said she ignored Namajunas's comments, stating "I believe as an athlete you have to focus on yourself." In describing her background and motivation for fighting, Namajunas stated, "I’ve got the Christ consciousness, I’ve got Lithuanian blood and I’ve got the American dream."

Family 
Namajunas is the fiancée and training partner of former Glory and UFC heavyweight Pat Barry.  Namajunas and Barry met at Duke Roufus' gym, where Barry started training after losing his home to Hurricane Katrina in 2005, while Namajunas started training there during high school.
Barry says he fell in love with Namajunas the first time he saw her. In a December 2014 interview, Barry said that he and Namajunas had been dating "for almost five years now", while Namajunas felt like it was "two or three years". The couple got engaged in 2014. UFC middleweight Sean Strickland has been openly critical of this relationship, describing it as predatory, given that Namajunas was allegedly 14 or 15 years old when she and Barry, who was 28, met. Namajunas herself has admitted that she and Barry “were apparently together a lot longer than [she] was aware of,” and that “it took him a while to chip away at [her] heart, but he did.” 

Namajunas has a brother named Nojus, who once operated a private piano studio. Namajunas herself has played the piano since the age of five. Nojus also is a mixed martial artist, and made his professional debut in March 2021.

Championships and accomplishments
Lithuanian American National Hall of Fame - Class of 2019
ESPY Award nominee (2018 for Best Fighter and 2021 for Best MMA Fighter)
Kids' Choice Sports 2018 Award for Biggest Powerhouse (nominee)
Eighth Annual Real Women Awards - 2017 Woman of the Year

Mixed martial arts
Ultimate Fighting Championship
UFC Women's Strawweight Championship (Two time; Former)
Two successful title defenses (overall)
 One successful title defense (first reign)
 One successful title defense (second reign)
Performance of the Night (Three times) vs. Paige VanZant, Joanna Jędrzejczyk, and Zhang Weili
Fight of the Night (Three times) vs. Karolina Kowalkiewicz and Jéssica Andrade (x2)
Tied (with Jéssica Andrade & Amanda Lemos) for most finishes in UFC Women's Strawweight division history (5)
First woman in UFC history to regain a championship title after losing it
 Holds victories over three former UFC Women's Strawweight Champions - Joanna Jędrzejczyk, Jéssica Andrade, and Zhang Weili
The Ultimate Fighter: A Champion Will Be Crowned (Runner-Up)
TUF 20 Fight of the Season vs. Joanne Calderwood
TUF 20 Performance of the Season vs. Joanne Calderwood
Invicta FC
Submission of the Night (Two times) vs. Emily Kagan, Kathina Catron

Crypto.com 
Fan Bonus of the Night 

Fighter of the Year
2017 MMA Fighter of the Year
ESPN, MMASucka, MMA Fighting (Top 5: #4), MMA Mania (Top 5: #4), RealSport (Top 5: #3) MMADNA
2017 UFC Fighter of the Year
CBS Sports (Top 5: #3)
2017 MMA Female Fighter of the Year
World MMA Awards, Yahoo Sports, MMAjunkie, Cageside Press, Combat Press, SevereMMA, MMA Today (Top 50: #1), Awakening Fighters, Promoting Real Women
2021 MMA Female Fighter of the Year
World MMA Awards (July 1, 2020–June 30, 2021), Cageside Press, Combat Press
2021 Women's MMA MVP
Wrestling Observer Newsletter
Upset of the Year
2017 MMA Upset of the Year vs. Joanna Jędrzejczyk
World MMA Awards, Sports Illustrated, Sherdog, MMAjunkie, MMA Fighting, MMA Weekly, Metro.co.uk, Combat Press, Fight Booth, MMASucka, The MMA Takeover, SevereMMA, Bloody Elbow (Top 3: #1)
2017 UFC Upset of the Year vs. Joanna Jędrzejczyk
Sport360, Pundit Arena, Per Sources
Submission of the Year
2013 MMA Submission of the Year vs. Kathina Catron
World MMA Awards (nominee), MMA Weekly, The MMA Corner
2013 Women's MMA Submission of the Year vs. Kathina Catron
Bleacher Report, Bloody Elbow, WMMA Press Association, Awakening Fighters, Promoting Real Women
2015 Women's MMA Submission of the Year vs. Paige VanZant
Awakening Fighters
2017 Women's MMA Submission of the Year vs. Michelle Waterson
Awakening Fighters (community)
Knockout of the Year
2017 Women's MMA Knockout of the Year vs. Joanna Jędrzejczyk
Awakening Fighters (community), Promoting Real Women
Fight of the Year
2013 Women's MMA Fight of the Year vs. Tecia Torres
Bleacher Report
Fight of the Month
 2019 May Fight of the Month vs. Jéssica Andrade
MMAJunkie.com
 2020 July Fight of the Month vs. Jéssica Andrade
MMAJunkie.com
Year's Most Violent
2017 Fight Booth Lady Violence Award
Sherdog.com's 2015 All-Violence Second Team: Strawweight
Sherdog.com's 2017 All-Violence Second Team: Strawweight

Mixed martial arts record

|-
|Loss
|align=center|11–5
|Carla Esparza
|Decision (split)
|UFC 274
|
|align=center|5
|align=center|5:00
|Phoenix, Arizona, United States
|
|-
|Win
|align=center|11–4
|Zhang Weili
|Decision (split)
|UFC 268
|
|align=center|5
|align=center|5:00
|New York City, New York, United States
|
|-
|Win
|align=center|10–4
|Zhang Weili
|KO (head kick)
|UFC 261
|
|align=center|1
|align=center|1:18
|Jacksonville, Florida, United States
|
|- 
|Win
|align=center|9–4
|Jéssica Andrade
|Decision (split)
|UFC 251 
|
|align=center|3
|align=center|5:00
|Abu Dhabi, United Arab Emirates
| 
|-
|Loss
|align=center|8–4
|Jéssica Andrade
|KO (slam) 
|UFC 237
|
|align=center|2
|align=center|2:58
|Rio de Janeiro, Brazil
|
|-
|Win
|align=center|8–3
|Joanna Jędrzejczyk
|Decision (unanimous)
|UFC 223
|
|align=center|5
|align=center|5:00
|Brooklyn, New York, United States
|
|-
|Win
|align=center|7–3
|Joanna Jędrzejczyk
|TKO (submission to punches) 
|UFC 217
|
|align=center|1
|align=center|3:03
|New York City, New York, United States
|
|-
|Win
|align=center|6–3
|Michelle Waterson
|Submission (rear-naked choke)
|UFC on Fox: Johnson vs. Reis
|
|align=center|2
|align=center|2:47
|Kansas City, Missouri, United States
|
|-
|Loss
|align=center|5–3
|Karolina Kowalkiewicz
|Decision (split)
|UFC 201
|
|align=center|3
|align=center|5:00
|Atlanta, Georgia, United States
|
|-
|Win
|align=center|5–2
|Tecia Torres
|Decision (unanimous)
|UFC on Fox: Teixeira vs. Evans
|
|align=center|3
|align=center|5:00
|Tampa, Florida, United States
|
|-
|Win
|align=center|4–2
|Paige VanZant
|Submission (rear-naked choke)
|UFC Fight Night: Namajunas vs. VanZant
|
|align=center|5
|align=center|2:25
|Las Vegas, Nevada, United States
|
|-
|Win
|align=center|3–2
|Angela Hill
| Submission (rear-naked choke)
|UFC 192
|
|align=center|1
|align=center|2:47
|Houston, Texas, United States
|
|-
| Loss
|align="center" | 2–2
| Carla Esparza
| Submission (rear-naked choke)
| The Ultimate Fighter: A Champion Will Be Crowned Finale
| 
|align="center" | 3
|align="center" | 1:26
| Las Vegas, Nevada, United States
| 
|-
| Loss
|align="center" | 2–1
| Tecia Torres
| Decision (unanimous)
| Invicta FC 6: Coenen vs. Cyborg
| 
|align="center" | 3
|align="center" | 5:00
| Kansas City, Missouri, United States
|
|-
| Win
|align="center" | 2–0
| Kathina Catron
| Submission (flying armbar)
| Invicta FC 5: Penne vs. Waterson
| 
|align="center" | 1
|align="center" | 0:12
| Kansas City, Missouri, United States
| 

|-
| Win
|align="center" | 1–0
| Emily Kagan
| Submission (rear-naked choke)
| Invicta FC 4: Esparza vs. Hyatt
| 
|align="center" | 3
|align="center" | 3:44
| Kansas City, Kansas, United States
| 

|-
|Win
|align=center|3–0
| Randa Markos
| Submission (kimura)
| rowspan=3|The Ultimate Fighter: A Champion Will Be Crowned
|( airdate)
|align=center|1
|align=center|2:45
|rowspan=3|Las Vegas, Nevada, United States
|
|-
|Win
|align=center|2–0
| Joanne Calderwood
| Submission (kimura)
|( airdate)
|align=center|2
|align=center|2:06
|
|-
|Win
|align=center|1–0
| Alex Chambers
| Submission (rear-naked choke)
|( airdate)
|align=center|1
|align=center|4:38
|

|-
| Win
| style="text-align:center;" | 4–0
| Jen Aniano
| TKO (head kick and punches)
| King of the Cage - Trump Card
| 
| style="text-align:center;" | 1
| style="text-align:center;" | 0:33
| Lac du Flambeau, Wisconsin
| 
|-
| Win
| style="text-align:center;" | 3–0
| Moriel Charneski
| Decision (unanimous)
| King of the Cage - March Mania
| 
| style="text-align:center;" | 3
| style="text-align:center;" | 3:00
| Walker, Minnesota
| 
|-
| Win
| style="text-align:center;" | 2–0
| Heather Bassett
| Decision (unanimous)
| King of the Cage - Winter Warriors
| 
| style="text-align:center;" | 3
| style="text-align:center;" | 3:00
| Walker, Minnesota
| 
|-
| Win
| style="text-align:center;" | 1–0
| Melissa Pacheco
| TKO (punches)
| North American Fight Championship - Relentless
| 
| style="text-align:center;" | 1
| style="text-align:center;" | 2:51
| West Allis, Wisconsin
|

Submission grappling record

See also
List of current UFC fighters
List of female mixed martial artists

References

External links
Rose Namajunas Awakening Profile

1992 births
Living people
Strawweight mixed martial artists
Sportspeople from Milwaukee
American anti-communists
American Christians
American people of Lithuanian descent
American practitioners of Brazilian jiu-jitsu
American female mixed martial artists
Mixed martial artists from Minnesota
Mixed martial artists from Wisconsin
Mixed martial artists utilizing taekwondo
Mixed martial artists utilizing karate
Mixed martial artists utilizing Brazilian jiu-jitsu
American female taekwondo practitioners
American female karateka
Ultimate Fighting Championship champions
Ultimate Fighting Championship female fighters
21st-century American women